Asteriscus is a genus of flowering plants in the family Asteraceae.

Species

 Species formerly included
Several species have been transferred to Pallenis or Rhanterium, most notably:
 Asteriscus maritimus (L.) Less., synonym of Pallenis maritima (L.) Greuter

Distribution
The genus is native to Europe, North Africa, Macaronesia, and the Middle East.

References

Bibliography

External links

 
Asteraceae genera
Flora of North Africa
Taxa named by Joseph Pitton de Tournefort